Luling High School is a public high school located in Luling, Texas (USA) and classified as a 3A school by the UIL. It is part of the Luling Independent School District located in the southwest corner of Caldwell County. In 2017, the school was rated "Met Standard" by the Texas Education Agency.

Athletics
The Luling High School is classified as a 3A school by UIL. The Luling Eagles compete in these sports.

Cross Country, Volleyball, Football, Basketball, Powerlifting, Golf, Tennis, Track, Softball & Baseball

State Titles

Boys Cross Country 
1999(3A), 2010(2A), 2011(2A), 2012(2A), 2013(2A), 2014(3A), 2015(3A), 2016(3A), 2017(3A)
Girls Track 
2000(3A)

State Finalist

Football 
1953(1A)
Volleyball 
2005(3A)
Baseball 
1994(3A)
Boys Track 
1978(2A)
Boys Cross Country 
1993(3A), 1994(3A), 1996(3A), 1997(3A), 1998(3A), 2000(3A), 2003(3A), 2005(3A), 2006(3A), 2007(3A), 2009(3A), 2018(3A), 2019(3A)
Girls Cross Country 
2006(3A), 2009(3A), 2011(3A), 2012(3A)

Luling Rosenwald (PVIL)
Boys Track
1944(C)

Academics

State Finalist
Marching Band 
2017(3A), 2015(3A), 2013(2A), 2011(2A), 1983(2A), 1982(2A)

Notable alumni

Ychilindria Spears- Most decorated track and field athlete in Texas prep history and was a three-time winner of the Texas Gatorade Track and Field Athlete of the Year and was named the national Gatorade Track and Field Athlete of the Year in 2001. (Class of 2002)

 Craig Mager- Former NFL Player / San Diego Chargers. Second Team All Sun Belt Conference [2014]. (Class of 2010)

References

External links
Luling ISD

Schools in Caldwell County, Texas
Public high schools in Texas